Zoeken naar Eileen W. is a novel written by Leon de Winter. First published January 1, 1981

Plot
A young man has just lost his young girlfriend, and becomes depressed. But then he meets a woman which resembles his late girlfriend a lot. Their meeting is brief, but the main character knows enough to know that he only wants her from that moment on. The only thing he knows of her, is that she speaks English, that she is from Northern Ireland and that she is called Eileen.

References

20th-century Dutch novels
Dutch-language novels
1981 novels